A special election was held in  on October 8, 1821 to fill a vacancy caused by the death of John Linn (DR) on January 5, 1821, prior to the start of the 17th Congress.

Election results

Condict took his seat with the rest of New Jersey's delegation at the start of the 1st session of the 17th Congress.

See also
List of special elections to the United States House of Representatives

References

New Jersey 1821 at-large
New Jersey 1821 at-large
1821 at-large
New Jersey at-large
United States House of Representatives at-large
United States House of Representatives 1821 at-large